Lottefors is a locality situated in Bollnäs Municipality, Gävleborg County, Sweden with 392 inhabitants in 2010.

References 

Populated places in Bollnäs Municipality
Hälsingland